Christopher Foster may refer to:

 Christopher Foster (cricketer) (1904–1971), English cricketer
 Christopher Foster (economist) (1930–2022), English academic
 Christopher Foster (bishop) (born 1953), Bishop of Portsmouth
 For the Shropshire, England arsonist and murderer, see Osbaston House deaths

See also
Chris Foster (disambiguation)